Chashan is a town under the direct administration of the prefecture-level city of Dongguan, Guangdong Province, China.

Transport
There are buses connecting the city of Dongguan, Guangzhou, Shenzhen and Dongguan other townships. Travel by bus is the best way to reach Chashan.

Railway 
 Dongguan railway station ( Guangzhou-Shenzhen Railway , Guangzhou - Shenzhen ) (Dongguan train terminal commenced service on January 4, 2014 ) 
 R2 Dongguan Rail Transit Line  
 Though the Kowloon Canton Railway runs through Chashan, it is not a convenient way to travel from Guangzhou (Canton), Shenzhen or Kowloon in Hong Kong to Chashan due to the time required.

Highway 
 Wanlong Road (Dongguan city - Shilong ) 
 Dan Dagong Road ( Shilong Town - Da Lingshan Town) 
 Expressway east Dongguan (Songshan Songshan Lake Road Interchange fast - Bridge Town Bridge Long Road) 
 Tea Cross-Island Highway (Chashan - Hengli Town)

Travel 
 Dongyue 
 Nanshe Ming  and Qing village
 Mai village house

Notable fruit
Chashan is noted for its litchi fruit which comes from the litchi chinensis, a Chinese tree that bears bright red fruits, each with a single large seed. Litchi taste best between May and June.

References

External links 
 

Geography of Dongguan
Towns in Guangdong